Richard Frederick Wood, Baron Holderness,  (5 October 1920 – 11 August 2002), was a British Conservative politician who held numerous ministerial positions from 1955 to 1974. He was distinctive in having lost both his legs in action in North Africa during World War II.

Early life, education and military service
Wood was the youngest son of Edward Wood, 1st Earl of Halifax, and Lady Dorothy Evelyn Augusta Onslow. He was educated at St Cyprian's School in Eastbourne, Eton College and New College, Oxford. He became honorary attaché at the British Embassy in Rome in 1940, and in 1941 he gained the rank of lieutenant in the King's Royal Rifle Corps. He fought in the Middle East between 1941 and 1943 and was severely wounded, losing both his legs in action. His elder brother Peter Wood was killed in action in Egypt in 1942.

Political career
Wood became MP for Bridlington in 1950 and held the seat until 1979. He was Parliamentary Private Secretary to Derick Heathcoat-Amory during his time successively as Minister of Pensions between 1951 and 1953, Minister of State at the Board of Trade between 1953 and 1954, and Minister of Agriculture and Fisheries between 1954 and 1955. Wood was then Joint Parliamentary Secretary at the Ministry of Pensions and National Insurance between 1955 and 1958, at the Ministry of Labour between 1958 and 1959 and at the Ministry of Power between 1959 and 1963. Wood urged Prime Minister Anthony Eden not to respond to the Suez Crisis overly aggressively, but his advice was ignored because of his father's association with appeasement and the Munich Agreement.

In 1959 he was invested as a Privy Counsellor (P.C.) and was Minister of Pensions and National Insurance from 1963 until the Conservative Party lost power in 1964. He was Minister of Overseas Development from 1970 to 1974 for the duration of the Heath Government. From 1987 to 1991 he was an energetic chairman of the Disablement Services Authority, charged with the improvement of artificial limb services: he then served as a junior Minister on services for disabled people.

Honours and personal life
Wood became Honorary Colonel of the Queen's Royal Rifles in 1962 and Honorary Colonel of the 4th (Volunteer) Battalion, Royal Green Jackets between 1967 and 1969. He held the office of Deputy Lieutenant (D.L.) of the East Riding, Yorkshire in 1967. He was awarded the honorary degree of Doctor of Law (LL.D.) by Sheffield University in 1962, by Leeds University in 1978 and by Hull University in 1982. He was a director of Hargreaves Group between 1974 and 1986 and also a director of FJC Lilley & Company. After he retired as an MP, Wood was given a life peerage on 7 August 1979 as Baron Holderness, of Bishop Wilton in the County of Humberside.

Wood married Diana Kellett, daughter of Colonel Edward Orlando Kellett, in 1947 and had a daughter and son.

Arms

References 
Times Guide to the House of Commons, 1951, 1966, October 1974

External links 
 

1920 births
2002 deaths
People educated at Eton College
People educated at St Cyprian's School
Alumni of New College, Oxford
King's Royal Rifle Corps officers
Conservative Party (UK) MPs for English constituencies
Holderness, Richard Wood, Baron
Royalty and nobility with disabilities
Younger sons of earls
Members of the Privy Council of the United Kingdom
UK MPs 1950–1951
UK MPs 1951–1955
UK MPs 1955–1959
UK MPs 1959–1964
UK MPs 1964–1966
UK MPs 1966–1970
UK MPs 1970–1974
UK MPs 1974
UK MPs 1974–1979
Holderness, Richard Wood, Baron
British Army personnel of World War II
English amputees
Ministers in the Eden government, 1955–1957
Ministers in the Macmillan and Douglas-Home governments, 1957–1964
Wood
Life peers created by Elizabeth II